CMRR may stand for:

 Catskill Mountain Railroad, operators of the former New York Central Railroad Catskill Mountain Branch from Kingston to Phoenicia
 Central Massachusetts Railroad, former railroad forming part of the Boston and Maine Railroad system
 Common-mode rejection ratio, measure of the capability of an instrument to reject a signal that is common to both input leads
 Chemistry and Metallurgy Research Replacement Facility, nuclear facility at Los Alamos National Laboratory